Blood in the Snow Canadian Film Festival (BITS) is an annual film festival in Canada. It was founded by Kelly Micheal Stewart in 2012 as an offshoot of his then ongoing monthly film series entitled "Fright Nights at the Projection Booth" which were held at the former Projection Booth theater in Toronto, Ontario. With a considerable number of Canadian films all vying for a spot in the showcase, Stewart decided to put together the first edition of what would become a yearly film festival that replaced the monthly series. After a first edition entitled "Fright Nights :Blood in the Snow Canadian Film Festival weekend", Stewart shortened the name and re-imagined the construct of the festival, bringing on a programming team and sharpening its focus with the aim of promoting, spotlighting and helping to develop the independent contemporary genre filmmaking community across Canada. The festival has branched off in its efforts to become visible all year round with a public access television interview show and a podcast.

History

2012

The first year of the festival began as spinoff of the monthly film night hosted and programmed by Kelly Michael Stewart called Fright Nights at the Projection Booth. The program that year included 6 feature films and 13 shorts, including the first iteration of the festival's popular "Short Film Showcase" in the form of a "best of 2012 shorts" programming block and a midnight film on the Saturday night of the festival. Running from November 30 to December 2, 2012, titles that year included the World Premieres of Sick: Survive the Night and In The House of Flies, along with screenings of Beyond The Black Rainbow, Devil's Night, Famine and the Canadian Premiere of Blood for Irina.

2013

2013 marked the first year the festival utilized a traditional festival submission layout with the introduction of a full programming team. The 2nd edition of the festival introduced other changes including a move to the Carlton Cinemas, running November 29 to December 1, 2013. The festival fine-tuned its prime-time shorts program and promptly sold out the screening, held a preview screening event to introduce their new surroundings on October 10 featuring the World Premiere of The Basement, started an interactive media day for press and filmmakers and created a vendor village of genre-themed merchants in the lobby. The lineup included 7 feature films and 16 shorts Films that year included Evangeline, Thanatomorphose, Ghostkeepers, Blood Riders: The Devil Rides with us, Clean Break, Criminal and Discopath.

2014

2014 saw the return of many of the initiatives from 2013 but added upon them. The lineup expanded to 8 features along with 15 shorts, and included the first educational Industry Panel from the festival, furthering its commitment to the genre community. In a first for the festival, multiple second screenings (running concurrently to the original schedule on a 2nd screen) had to be added due to ticket demand. Continuing at the Carlton in its third year on November 28 to 30, 2014, the festival screened the world premieres of Teddy Bomb and Heinous Acts along with Canadian and Toronto premieres of Berkshire County, Queen of Blood (starring Skinny Puppy's Nivek Ogre), Ejecta, Bloody Knuckles, Black Mountain Side and Kingdom Come.

2015

2015 would prove to be the last year at the Carlton Cinema as the festival continued to grow and simply needed a bigger venue going forward. The 4th edition of the festival saw the expansion of the Industry Panels put on by the festival but also saw the shrinking down of the vendor village. The lineup included 8 feature films and 15 shorts and again featured multiple screenings for many films. The 4th edition ran from November 27 to 29, 2015 and hosted the world premieres of Night Cries, Secret Santa and White Raven along with local and Canadian premieres of Farhope Tower, The Dark Stranger, Save Yourself, Bite and Larry Kent's controversial She Who Must Burn, which won best picture that year.

2016

The 2016 festival moved to the confines of the Cineplex Odeon Yonge & Dundas Cinemas for its 5th edition. The move – spurred by the ticket sales of previous years – meant moving into a theater screen with more than double the capacity of the previous venue, alleviating the need for repeat screenings and allowing audiences to view the entire program without screening conflicts. The festival also expanded to 4 days from the previous 3, running Nov 24 to Nov 27, 2016. Industry Panels moved to Duke's Refresher bar and the festival ran not one but two midnight screenings, one each both Friday and Saturday night, as the lineup moved to 9 features and 24 shorts. The festival also launched its first DVD compilation of short films entitled "Blood in the Snow presents: Bloody BITS Shorts Compilation" for sale in the lobby of the theater. Films hosted included World Premieres of 3 Dead Trick or Treaters, Streamer  and Inspiration along with Toronto Premieres of Capture Kill Release, The Sublet, 24 x 36: A Movie about Movie Posters, Holy Hell, Kidnap Capital and Best Picture Winner The Unseen.

2017

The 6th edition of the festival saw another venue change as BITS moved to it new home at The Royal Cinema. The move meant the elimination of the traditional midnight show that had been part of the programming since year 1, but saw the festival stay at 4 days in length, running Nov 23–Nov 26, 2017. The move also added another 100 seats in capacity for the festival and attendance numbers continued to grow. Industry Panels moved to the local Monarch Tavern and the festival also held its first-ever movie poster gallery show in conjunction with the festival at nearby artspace the Super Wonder Gallery. The lineup showed 9 feature films and 23 shorts and also included formal awards show hosted by Nick Smyth after the completion of the closing gala film. Films hosted included World Premieres of Red Spring and Blood Child as well as critical darlings Fake Blood and The Child Remains along with Best Picture winner Buckout Road, Art of Obsession, Kill Order (aka Meza), Darken and holiday themed slasher Once Upon a Time at Christmas.

2018

Announced in January 2018, BITS 7th edition will be expanding yet again as the festival will now run 6 days from Nov 22 to Nov 27, 2018 at the Royal Cinema. Film Submissions opened February 1, 2018 on Film Freeway.

Other projects

Late Night Double Feature

In 2014, many of the team behind the Blood in the Snow Canadian Film Festival made an anthology film called Late Night Double Feature. The film project was developed by Festival Director Kelly Michael Stewart and directed by three BITS alumni directors Navin Ramaswaran (One More For The Road), Zach Ramelan (Dead Rush) and Torin Langen (Malleus Maleficarum). The film also features acting roles from Kelly Michael Stewart and BITS Senior Programmers Jason Tannis (who was also an Executive Producer), Kirk Haviland, BITS team members Jen Gorman & R.X. Zammit. To avoid a conflict of interest, the film did not play BITS and the film had its Canadian Premiere at the 2015 Canadian Film Fest on March 26, 2015 instead.

BITS TV

Blood in the Snow started its own spin-off TV series on Bell tv1 in early 2016. This series is free on demand for Bell subscribers on Channel One. This interview style TV series is hosted by Festival Director Kelly Michael Stewart and was shot at the Carlton Cinema (where the festival took place between 2013 and 2015). Its guests for season one included Ryan M. Andrews, Brigitte Kingsley, Chris Alexander, Justin McConnell, Tricia Lee and Christopher Grioux. Season 2 featured a couple/group interview dynamic as opposed to the solo interview style of season 1 with guests including Bea Macapagal and Larica Perera, Greg Kovacs and Darren Hutchings, Gabriel Carrer and Ry Barrett, Cody Calahan and Chad Archbald, Richard Powell and Zach Green, Kat Threlkeld and Lance Fernandes along with Greg and Colette Jeffs. In 2017 it was revealed that Bell would be phasing out Bell TV1 from its cable channel lineup, but BITS TV lives on as a series of pre-show segments played during the festival.

BITS RADIO

2017 saw the launch of BITS RADIO, a new interview-based podcast hosted by Robert Bellamy along with rotating co-hosts from the BITS team including Kelly Michael Stewart, Jason Tannis, Kirk Haviland and Carolyn Mauricette. The podcast started with a live launch at the London On-based Shock Stock genre convention and has featured interviews done at Toronto's Horrorama convention after the 2017 lineup announcement as well as interviews done in front of a live audience at the 2017 festival. The podcast remains ongoing.

Bloody BITS

In 2016, in conjunction with Black Fawn Distribution (a sub-division of Black Fawn Films), BITS released a shorts compilation containing some of the best shorts from its first 4 years entitled "Blood in the Snow Presents: Bloody BITS Short Compilation". The DVD featured 7 shorts from previous festivals including Dead All Night, Lively, Uncommon Enemies, Greater Than, One More For The Road, Tasha and Friends and Seiren. As of February 2018, a 2nd volume of the compilation is in the works and expected to be ready before the end of the year.

References

External links

Film festivals in Toronto
Fantasy and horror film festivals in Canada
Film festivals established in 2012